ČT1 (ČT Jedna, Česká televize 1, "Jednička") is the Czech public television channel, operated by Czech Television. ČT1 is a general purpose channel, showing family-oriented television, Czech movies, children's programming, news and documentaries.

History 
ČST starts experimental broadcasting throughout Czechoslovakia on 1 May 1953 from its Prague Studio. Its first regular broadcast begin on 25 February 1954.

In 1970, the ČST was renamed to ČST1 and in 1975 the channel transitioned from black-and-white to colour.

Following the entry of federalism in Czechoslovakia in 1990, ČST1 became F1.

On 1 January 1993, F1 changes its name to ČT1 in Czech Republic and STV1 in Slovak Republic. Now, the first channel of the new Česká televize, created one year earlier following the Velvet Revolution.

Series

 Agatha Christie's Poirot
 Commissaire Moulin
 Un passo dal cielo

Logos and identities

ČT1 HD 

ČT1 HD is the high-definition TV channel from Czech Television. ČT1 HD broadcasts programming from ČT1 via IPTV, digital terrestrial  and satellite (via Astra 3B – DVB-S2 standard).

Previously HD programming was shown on ČT HD, covering ČT1, ČT2 and ČT4.

See also
Television in the Czech Republic
ČT2
ČT HD
Telecommunications in the Czech Republic

References

External links
Official website
Program ČT1

Television stations in the Czech Republic
Television channels and stations established in 1953
Czech-language television stations
Czech Television